The Institute of Human Resources Development (IHRD) is an autonomous technical educational research institute established by the Government of Kerala in 1987, with its headquarters at Thiruvananthapuram in India. 

IHRD has grown within a short period into a network of more than 50 institutions. In addition to regular courses of study in academic establishments, IHRD also runs short and long-term employment-oriented and continuous education programmes.

The initial name of IHRD was Institute of Human Resources Development for Electronics (IHRDE). Later it was renamed to the current version.

IHRD manages several applied science colleges, engineering colleges, polytechnics, and technical schools.

Technical institutes managed by IHRD

Engineering colleges 
The following nine engineering colleges are managed by IHRD. They were affiliated with the Cochin University of Science and Technology until 2014; each of them  has been affiliated to A P J Abdul Kalam Technological University since 2015.

IHRD coordinates 8 Engineering Colleges.

Government Model Engineering College
College of Engineering Chengannur
College of Engineering, Adoor
College of Engineering Karunagappally
College of Engineering, Poonjar
College of Engineering, Kallooppara
College of Engineering Attingal
College of Engineering, Cherthala
College of Engineering, Kottarakkara

Model Polytechnics Colleges 
IHRD coordinates 8 Model Polytechnics Colleges.
 Model Residential Polytechnic College, Kuzhalmannam, Palakkad
 Model Polytechnic College, Mattakkara, Kottayam
 Model Polytechnic College, Vatakara, Kozhikode
 Model polytechnic college Poonjar, Kottayam
 Model Polytechnic College, Karunagappally
 Model Polytechnic College, Painavu, Idukki
 E K Nayanar Memorial Model Polytechnic College, Kallyassery
 K.Karunakaran Memorial Model Polytechnic College, Mala
Model Polytechnic College, Ponjar

Applied Science Colleges 
IHRD coordinates 42 Applied Science Colleges.

Colleges  affiliated to University of Kerala
 College of Applied Science, Dhanuvachapuram, Trivandrum
 College of Applied Sciences, Adoor
 College of Applied Sciences, Mavelikkara
 College of Applied Sciences, Kundera
 college of Applied sciences, karthikappally

Colleges  affiliated to Mahatma Gandhi University
College of Applied Sciences, Puthuppally, Kottayam
 College of Applied Sciences, Thodupuzha
 College of Applied Sciences, Peermade
 College of Applied Science, Konni
 College of Applied Sciences, Mallappally
 College Of Applied Science, Kaduthuruthy
College of Applied science, Petta   Kanjirappally
College of Applied science, Puthanvelikkara
College of Applied science, Kattapana
College of Applied science, Nedumkandam

Colleges  affiliated to University of Calicut
College of Applied Science Calicut
College of Applied Science, Vattamkulam, Edappal
 College of Applied Science, Nattika
 College of Applied Science Malappuram
 College of Applied Science, Nadapuram
 College of Applied Sciences, Thiruvambady
College of Applied Science Thamarassery
 College of Applied Science, Vadakkencherry
 College of Applied science, Chelakkara
 College of Applied science, Ayalur
 College of Applied Science, Muthuallur, Malappuram

Colleges  affiliated to Kannur University
 College of Applied Sciences, Koothuparamba
 College of Applied Sciences, Pattuvam
 EMS Memorial College of Applied Science
 AKG Memorial College of Applied Science, Pinarayi, Thalassery
 College of Applied Science, Neruvampram, Pazhayangati
College of Applied Science, Cheemeni

Technical Higher Secondary Schools
IHRD coordinates 15 Technical Higher Secondary Schools

 Model Technical Higher Secondary School, Kaprassery
 Technical Higher Secondary School, Adoor
 Technical Higher Secondary School, Aluva
 Technical Higher Secondary School, Cherthala
 Technical Higher Secondary School, Kaloor
 Technical Higher Secondary School, Mallappally
 Technical Higher Secondary School, Muttada, Trivandrum
 Technical Higher Secondary School, Perinthalmanna
 Technical Higher Secondary School, Perumade
 Technical Higher Secondary School, Puthuppally
 Technical Higher Secondary School, Thiruthiyad
 Technical Higher Secondary School, Thodupuzha, Muttom
 Technical Higher Secondary School, Varadium
 Technical Higher Secondary School, Vattamkulam
 Technical Higher Secondary School, Vazhakkad

References

External links 
 IHRD homepage

 
Organisations based in Thiruvananthapuram
Educational organisations based in India
Engineering education in India
1987 establishments in Kerala
Educational institutions established in 1987